Zoe Wilson may refer to:

 Zoe Wilson (Coronation Street)
 Zoe Wilson (field hockey) (born 1997), Irish field hockey player